Ijaz Masih is a Pakistani politician who was elected member for the Provincial Assembly of Punjab.

Political career
He was elected to Provincial Assembly of Punjab on a reserved seat for minorities in 2018 Pakistani general election representing Pakistan Tehreek-e-Insaf

On 12 September 2018, he was inducted into the provincial Punjab cabinet of Chief Minister Sardar Usman Buzdar. On 13 September 2018, he was appointed as Provincial Minister of Punjab for Human Rights & Minorities Affairs.

He de-seated due to vote against party policy for Chief Minister of Punjab election  on 16 April 2022.

References

Living people
Pakistan Tehreek-e-Insaf MPAs (Punjab)
Politicians from Punjab, Pakistan
Punjab MPAs 2018–2023
Provincial ministers of Punjab
Year of birth missing (living people)